Led Zepagain (stylized Led ZepAgain) is an American hard rock tribute band formed in Ventura, California.  The current band consists of vocalist/harmonica player Swan Montgomery ("Robert Plant"), Guitar/ Mandolin Anthony David Thymiakos ("Jimmy Page"), bassist/keyboardist/mandolinist Jim Wootten ("John Paul Jones") and drummer/percussionist Scott Brooks ("John Bonham"). The group was formed in 1988 and is considered one of the top Zeppelin tribute bands in Southern California.

Discography
Led Zepagain:  A Tribute To Led Zeppelin (2005)
Led Zepagain II:  A Tribute To Led Zeppelin (2007)
Led Zepagain III:  A Tribute To Led Zeppelin (2012)
Label:  Titan Music Inc, D/B/A Titan Tribute Media

Led Zepagain:  The Sound Remains the Same Vol. 1 (2015)
Led Zepagain:  The Sound Remains the Same Vol. 2 (2015)
Label:  Sony Music Entertainment Japan

References

External links
 

Hard rock musical groups from California
Led Zeppelin tribute bands
Musical groups from Los Angeles
Musical quartets
Musical groups established in 1992
1992 establishments in California